HMS Arno was a unique destroyer of the Royal Navy that saw service and was lost during First World War. She was under construction in Genoa, Italy for the friendly Portuguese Navy as Liz in 1914 when she was bought by the Royal Navy for service in the Mediterranean.

She had two funnels and masts and four QF 12-pounder guns, shipped sided on the forecastle, behind the second funnel and on the quarterdeck. Although much smaller and slower than her British contemporaries, she was soundly built and had a high freeboard and tall bridge, making her a useful vessel. She was lost off the Dardanelles after a collision with the Acorn-/H-class destroyer  on 23 March 1918.

Bibliography
Destroyers of the Royal Navy, 1893-1981, Maurice Cocker, 1983, Ian Allan, 

Destroyers of the Portuguese Navy
Destroyers of Italy
Destroyers of the Royal Navy
Ships built in Genoa
1914 ships
World War I destroyers of the United Kingdom
World War I shipwrecks in the Dardanelles
Maritime incidents in 1918
Ships sunk in collisions
Ships built by Gio. Ansaldo & C.
Shipwrecks of Turkey